Donald Mackay-Coghill (born 4 November 1941) is a South African cricketer. He played in 73 first-class matches between 1962 and 1974.

References

External links
 

1941 births
Living people
South African cricketers
Gauteng cricketers
Place of birth missing (living people)